Chang Yi Wang (IPA: [tʃɒ̌ŋ jí wɒ́ŋ]) is the founder of United Biomedical, Inc. (UBI), headquartered in Hauppauge, New York, and its group of companies in Asia (including United Biomedical Asia).

Wang was born in Taiwan in 1951. Her father was a member of the National Assembly. She majored in organic chemistry when she was doing her undergraduate at the National Taiwan University, and then she went to Rockefeller University for her doctorate degree. In 1985, Wang founded United Biomedical, Inc. in New York whose main focus is on medicine and vaccine development. She founded United Biomedical, Inc. Asia in Taiwan in 1998.

Wang is the author of more than 120 peer-reviewed scientific publications, and she is the inventor of more than 80 patents to date. In 2007, the New York Intellectual Property Law Association (NYIPLA) presented Wang with the Inventor of the Year Award.
In 2018, the Brain Mapping Foundation presented Wang with the Pioneer in Technology Award.

Early life and education 

Wang graduated with honors from the National Taiwan University in 1973, majoring in chemistry. She received her Ph.D. degree from Rockefeller University with a dual specialization in Biochemistry and Immunology in 1979 and then joined the Memorial Sloan Kettering Cancer Center as the youngest faculty member, principal investigator, and head of the molecular immunology laboratory.

Career in immunology and entrepreneurship in the biomedical industry 
Chang Yi Wang also founded UBI Asia subsidiary companies in Asia: United Biopharma and UBI Pharma in 2013 and 2014 respectively.

In 2009, the Bill and Melinda Gates Foundation awarded Grand Challenges Exploration Grants to Chang Yi Wan for the Synthetic Peptides to Inhibit HIV Entry program.

Professional and honorary affiliations 
National Institutes of Health, United States
National Taiwan University (Adjunct Professor)
National Tsing Hua University (Adjunct Professor)

References

External links 
Official site

1951 births
Living people
Writers from Taipei
Taiwanese women scientists
Taiwanese immunologists
Taiwanese emigrants to the United States
National Taiwan University alumni
Rockefeller University alumni
Science writers
21st-century Taiwanese scientists
21st-century Taiwanese women
20th-century Taiwanese scientists
20th-century Taiwanese women
21st-century Taiwanese women writers
21st-century Taiwanese writers
20th-century Taiwanese women writers
20th-century Taiwanese writers